Ashuganj Power Station is located near to the Titas Gas field and at the bank of river Meghna, Bangladesh. It consists of 1627 megawatt units. An agreement was signed in 1966 with a foreign construction company to establish a Thermal Power Plant in Ashuganj. It is owned and operated by Ashuganj Power Station Company Ltd.

Plant status

Installed capacity 
1876 MW
Present Capacity (Net Output)
 1627 MW
On Going Projects :
Ashuganj 400MW CCPP (East)
Land Acquisition, Land Development and Protection for Patuakhali 1320 MW Super Thermal Power Plant Project.

Corporate office 

Navana Rahim Ardent (Level-8)
185, Shahid Syed Nazrul Islam Sarani
(Old 39, Kakrail, Bijoy Nagar)
Paltan, Dhaka

See also

Electricity sector in Bangladesh
List of power stations in Bangladesh

References

Energy in Bangladesh
Electric power in Bangladesh
Fossil fuel power stations in Bangladesh
Power stations in Bangladesh
Organisations based in Ashuganj